The International Center for Technology Assessment (ICTA) is a U.S. non-profit bi-partisan organization, based in Washington, D.C.

ICTA was formed in 1994. Its executive director is Andrew Kimbrell. Its sister organization is the Center for Food Safety.

In 2004, ICTA took an active part in Monsanto Canada Inc. v. Schmeiser, a leading Supreme Court of Canada case on patent rights for biotechnology. The case involved Percy Schmeiser, a Saskatchewan canola farmer. Intervening on Schmeiser’s behalf were a consortium of six non-government organizations, among which was the International Center for Technology Assessment. Schmeiser lost the case.

In 2006, Friends of the Earth and ICTA filed a formal petition with the Food and Drug Administration urging better monitoring and regulation of cosmetic and toiletry products containing nanoparticles, and stating that they would sue the FDA if it did not take adequate action in 180 days.

See also
Implications of nanotechnology
Nanotoxicology
Regulation of nanotechnology
Environmental implications of nanotechnology
Health implications of nanotechnology
Genetically modified food controversies
Polly the sheep
Institute on Biotechnology and the Human Future

References

Bibliography
Principles for the Oversight of Nanotechnologies and Nanomaterials (PDF file) ICTA - January 31, 2008

External links
International Center For Technology Assessment
Dust-Up: The Great Nanotech Debate, Op-Ed series, Los Angeles Times, (Feb 25-29, 2008).
Center for Corporate Policy
 Military Nanotechnology Applications
 ASU's Center on Nanotechnology and Society
 UCSB's Center on Nanotechnology and Society
 The Nanoethics Group
 Center for Responsible Nanotechnology
 The NanoEthicsBank

Environmental organizations based in Washington, D.C.
Nanotechnology institutions